The 6th People's Choice Awards, honoring the best in popular culture for 1979, were held in Hollywood on January 24, 1980. They were broadcast on CBS.

Winners

The categories and winners:

Favorite Motion Picture
Rocky II

Favorite New Song, Age 12-21
"Babe"

Favorite All-Around Male Entertainer
Alan Alda

Favorite Female Performer In A New TV Program
Stefanie Powers

Favorite Motion Picture Actress
Jane Fonda

Favorite All-Around Female Entertainer 
Carol Burnett

Favorite TV Dramatic Program
Dallas

Favorite Young TV Performer
Gary Coleman

Favorite Male Performer In A New TV Program
Robert Wagner

Favorite Male TV Performer
Alan Alda

Favorite New TV Dramatic Program
Hart to Hart

Favorite TV Comedy Program 
M*A*S*H

Favorite Female TV Performer
Carol Burnett

Favorite Motion Picture Actor
Burt Reynolds

Favorite Theme/Song From A Motion Picture
"The Main Event/Fight"

Favorite Young Motion Picture Actress
Kristy McNichol

References

People's Choice Awards
1979 awards
1980 in American television
1979 awards in the United States
January 1980 events in the United States